Christopher Kapessa (6 January 2006 – 1 July 2019) was a Welsh boy who died at the age of 13 in the River Cynon on 1 July 2019. According to Kapessa's family and their representatives, the police investigation into the incident lasted around two days, the event declared "an accident" within 24 hours. A fortnight later, the anti-racist charity The Monitoring Group submitted a complaint to South Wales Police on behalf of Kapessa's mother Alina Joseph, alleging racial discrimination in the police response. In February 2020, the Crown Prosecution Service (CPS) reported that there was "sufficient evidence" but not "public interest" for a manslaughter case against a child suspected to have pushed Kapessa into the river.

Joseph has criticised the South Wales Police as "institutionally racist". The local community in Wales and internet crowdfunding have provided money to the family, which supports their legal fees. In June 2020, the subject received attention as part of the Black Lives Matter movement.

Background
According to The Times, Kapessa's mother Alina Joseph was born in the Congo and moved to the UK in the 1990s. Born on 16 January 2006, Christopher Kapessa had six siblings and was raised by his single mother, who worked as a bus driver. Kapessa was born in London, with the family moving to Wales in 2011. Joseph reported that the family had been called "the only blacks in the village" in Wales and were subject to racist bullying and harassment, one incident leaving Christopher alone "in a pool of his own blood". Her lawyer reported that her home had been vandalised with graffiti.

Christopher Kapessa attended Mountain Ash Comprehensive School. He was a member of the local Mountain Ash junior football team and also enjoyed dancing. In 2018, he and his siblings survived a fire at their house in Hirwaun, Wales.

Death
Aged 13, Christopher Kapessa died on 1 July 2019 in the River Cynon in Fernhill, Rhondda Cynon Taf, Wales. Kapessa was unable to swim. On the day of his death, Kapessa had told Joseph he was going to play football with his friends after school. Later evidence, according to the Crown Prosecution Service (CPS), made it clear that Kapessa was pushed into the river in an action that was "not in an effort to harm someone". The CPS said that the suspect was aged 14 at the time of the incident, had a "good school record" and had never previously come to the attention of the police. The suspect has been reported to be white and male.

Alina Joseph was informed that he had "jumped off a bridge" around 5p.m. by a sports coach. Emergency services were notified of the incident around 5:40p.m. A South Wales Police search team, firefighters, paramedics and a helicopter were dispatched; Kapessa's body was recovered from the river and he was pronounced dead at the scene.

Police investigations
According to the director of the anti-racist charity The Monitoring Group, police ruled the incident "an accident" within 24 hours. The family claimed that the investigation had stopped around a day after the incident was declared an accident, by which time four of the 14 people present at the scene had been contacted by police. Joseph reported that on multiple occasions, police presented her with glasses that did not belong to her son and tried to convince her that they did.

On 17 July 2019, The Monitoring Group filed a complaint to South Wales Police on behalf of Joseph, alleging racial discrimination in the police's treatment of the incident. Joseph later said that the police were "insensitive" and had been "unable to answer many of the most basic of our questions". Joseph was also in contact with Race Alliance Wales, who urged a "full investigation" into both the death of Kapessa and the police conduct in response to the incident.

It was reported on 26 July 2019 that, according to Hilary Brown of Race Alliance Wales, the investigation was pursuing possible manslaughter. Chief superintendent Dorian Lloyd said that the investigation had now been passed to "the major crime investigation team". A teenage boy was reported to be in cooperation with the police over their inquiries. The police said that a family liaison officer was in contact with Kapessa's family. By February 2020, the team had taken 170 statements and conducted 54 child interviews.

In February 2020, the Crown Prosecution Service commented that there was "sufficient evidence" for a manslaughter prosecution case. However, they reported that no such case would go ahead as there was not "public interest" for it. The family's lawyer called the response "disappointing" but said that "we are not looking for retribution". Joseph criticised the response and called the South Wales Police "institutionally racist".

Joseph took legal action against the Director of Public Prosecutions for the failure to prosecute the boy who allegedly pushed Christopher Kapessa into the river. Her application for judicial review was heard in court on 13 January 2022. The High Court upheld the original decision, with Lord Justice Popplewell saying in the decision that "the factors militating against a prosecution in this case outweigh the factors in favour of a prosecution".

Public reaction
In July 2019, the local community raised in excess of £9,000 to go to Kapessa's family across various fundraisers, according to WalesOnline. By February 2020, Kapessa's family had launched a crowdfunding campaign to pay for their legal fees. A petition calling for further investigation into the cases of Kapessa's death and the death of Shukri Abdi had reached 5,000 signatures by March 2020.

Organisations who have expressed concern over the police handling of case include Racism Alliance Wales, Cardiff Stand Up To Racism, Women Connect First and Black Association of Women Stepping Out. In June 2020, campaigners in the Black Lives Matter movement compared the police handling of the case to that of the murder of Stephen Lawrence in 1993. Kapessa's mother said that members of the movement had made her feel "like you have the world behind you".

See also
Death of Ricky Reel

References

Further reading

Deaths in Wales
2006 births
2019 deaths
2019 in Wales
July 2019 events in the United Kingdom
Deaths by drowning in the United Kingdom
History of Rhondda Cynon Taf
Immigration to Wales
Deaths by person in Wales
Child deaths